Făurești is a commune located in Vâlcea County, Oltenia, Romania. It is composed of five villages: Bungețani, Făurești, Găinești, Mărcușu and Milești (the commune centre). It also included the villages of Băbeni-Oltețu, Budești, Colelia and Diculești until 2004, when these were split off to form Diculești Commune.

References

Communes in Vâlcea County
Localities in Oltenia